Greenhead Moss Community Nature Park, or simply Greenhead Moss is a nature reserve and public park in the town of Wishaw in North Lanarkshire, Scotland. Despite its small area of only 100 hectares, the park has many different flora and fauna. The most notable feature of the park is the Perchy Pond, an artificial pond known for its many Swans and Amphibians. The area is naturally occurring, and the area around the pond was designated as a Local nature reserve (LNR), in 1989, with the rest of the Moss being designated so by 2013. The main habitat is moorland and Bogs, although flower Meadows and woods are also predominant.

History 
According to park signs, the landscape formed around 10,000 years ago in the Mesolithic, with known habitation occurring as far back as 2,000 years ago. The marshes and peat bogs were used as a source of fuel by the Britons in ancient times. The peat in the moss was used for fuel as late as 1993. Coal mining became the industry of choice during the Industrial Revolution with OS Maps showing small coal mines and railways on the land. These were short lived however. 

After the designation of the Pond as an LNR in 1989, the council acquired the land in 1999 and the community trust for the park was established. This new nature reserve lay between the Wishaw neighbourhoods of Greenhead and Cambusnethan and soon was fitted with new pathways, stairs and gates. These regeneration efforts mainly took place during the early 2000s. They were a large success in making the Moss the nature park it is today.

Cambusnethan Bog Body 
On 23 March 1932 a local Wishaw worker by the name of Gerald Ronlink was digging peat in the Moss, when he came across the preserved body of a fully clothed man about two feet beneath the bog. While his clothes were partially damaged, a unique jacket, cap and leather boots could be made out. The body was identified to have been buried in the 1680s, and the man to be a foot soldier of some sort, most likely a Covenanter. 

The man was around age 50, 5'6 (1.66m) tall, with brown hair and size 7 feet, and was found to have had a severe blow to the head. It has been theorised that the man was most likely the victim of a murder. He was probably a Covenanter soldier who had been cut off from the rest of his group, and was then found and killed by political enemies. His body then buried in the wet, isolated bogs of Cambusnethan to avoid discovery.

References

Parks in North Lanarkshire
North Lanarkshire articles missing geocoordinate data
1989 establishments in Scotland
Wishaw
Local nature reserves in Scotland